The 1990 World Junior Curling Championships were held from March 18 to 24 in Portage la Prairie, Manitoba, Canada.

It was the first World Junior Championships to include teams from Finland.

Men

Teams

Round Robin

Tiebreakers

For 4th place:

For 8th place:

Playoffs

Rankings

Women

Teams

Round Robin

Playoffs

Rankings

Awards

WJCC All-Star Team:

WJCC Sportsmanship Award:

Sources

J
1990 in Canadian curling
World Junior Curling Championships
Curling competitions in Manitoba
Sport in Portage la Prairie
International curling competitions hosted by Canada
March 1990 sports events in Canada
1990 in youth sport
1990 in Manitoba